The 53rd World Science Fiction Convention (Worldcon), also known as Intersection, was held on 24–28 August 1995 at the SEC Centre and the nearby Moat House Hotel in Glasgow, United Kingdom.  Evening social events also took place at the  Central and Crest Hotels.

The organising committee was co-chaired by Vincent Docherty and Martin Easterbrook.

The convention was the first Worldcon to be held in Scotland and was also the 2018 Eurocon.

Participants 

Attendance was 4,173, out of 6,524 paid memberships.

Guests of Honour 

 Samuel R. Delany (writer)
 Gerry Anderson (media)
 Les Edwards (artist)
 Vin¢ Clarke (fan)
 Mike Jittlov (special guest)
 Diane Duane and Peter Morwood were Toast Mr & Mrs (toastmasters)

Awards

1995 Hugo Awards 

 Best Novel: Mirror Dance by Lois McMaster Bujold
 Best Novella: "Seven Views of Olduvai Gorge" by Mike Resnick
 Best Novelette: "The Martian Child" by David Gerrold
 Best Short Story: "None So Blind" by Joe Haldeman
 Best Non-Fiction Book: I.Asimov: A Memoir by Isaac Asimov
 Best Dramatic Presentation: "All Good Things..." - Star Trek: The Next Generation Written by Ronald D. Moore & Brannon Braga and directed by Winrich Kolbe
 Best Professional Editor: Gardner Dozois
 Best Professional Artist: Jim Burns
 Best Original Art Work: Lady Cottington's Pressed Fairy Book by Brian Froud and Terry Jones
 Best Semiprozine: Interzone edited by David Pringle
 Best Fanzine: Ansible edited by Dave Langford
 Best Fan Writer: David Langford
 Best Fan Artist: Teddy Harvia

Other awards 

 John W. Campbell Award for Best New Writer: Jeff Noon

Notes 

The British science fiction writer John Brunner died of a stroke on 25 August 1995, while attending the convention. 

A Channel 4 magazine programme about the event and Science Fiction in Scotland, ‘Beam Me Up, Scotty!’, was filmed at the convention and presented by Craig Charles.

See also 

 Hugo Award
 Science fiction
 Speculative fiction
 World Science Fiction Society
 Worldcon

References

External links 

 Homepage of Intersection
 World Science Fiction Society

1990s in Glasgow
1995 conferences
1995 in Scotland
History of Glasgow
Science fiction conventions in Europe
Science fiction conventions in the United Kingdom
Scottish science fiction
Worldcon